A rug (UK), blanket (equine and other livestock, US), or coat (canine and other companion animals, US) is a covering or garment made by humans to protect their pets from the elements, as in a horse rug or dog coat.  

Rugs are also used to protect the pelage of show animals, particularly if the wool or fleece is to be judged, as in alpaca fleece sent to an agricultural show, where it would be desirable to have the wool free from dirt and debris. Small dogs and dogs with thin pelage often need protection from extreme weather.

Horse rugs 

Horse rugs are used for many reasons. They can be waterproof to keep the horse dry in wet weather and allow it to be turned out. They are also used as a means of providing extra warmth, especially to clipped horses, as well as a method of keeping flies off the animal in summer. They help keep a horse clean.

See also
 Coat (animal)

References

Dog equipment
Dog shows and showing
Horse management